Hollington Wood is a small patch of ancient woodland about a mile south-east of the village of Emberton near Olney in the City of Milton Keynes, Buckinghamshire, England.

External links
 article on the Milton Keynes Council website about a new path through the wood.
 Hollington Wood now has its own web site.

Forests and woodlands of Buckinghamshire